Dharam-Veer is a 1977 Hindi-language period action-drama film, directed by Manmohan Desai, produced by Subhas Desai under the Mehboob Studios and R.K. Studios banner, starring Dharmendra, Jeetendra, Zeenat Aman, Neetu Singh, Pran, etc.

Its music was composed by Laxmikant–Pyarelal. Dharmendra's younger son Bobby Deol appears briefly playing the childhood version of his father's character. It was part of Desai's four big hits of the year based on the "separated and reunited" theme (the others being Parvarish, Chacha Bhatija (which also starred Dharmendra) and Amar Akbar Anthony).
 
Dharam-Veer takes place in a mythical kingdom and tells the tale of twin brothers Dharam played by Dharamendra and Veer played by Jeetendra, who gets separated at birth, later who still becomes best friends in childhood, not knowing that they were real brothers, later turns against each other due to conspiracies of villains and in the end reunite. Upon theatrical release this film went on to become a big blockbuster at the Indian box office, becoming the second highest-grossing film of 1977 as well as one of the biggest hits of the 1970s decade.

Plot

Maharani Meenakshi is a princess who, one day while out hunting, is rescued from a handful of attackers by a hunter-warrior Jwala Singh (Pran), who lives alone in the jungle, accompanied only by his pet falcon, Sheroo. She offers him a reward for saving her life, but he only wants her hand in marriage, which he had been denied by her father. During the night, they are awoken by another tiger, and Jwala goes to slay it. The tiger kills a villager, and Jwala puts his poncho over him to cover his dead body. He wrestles with the tiger, and they both fall over a cliff. The Princess sees the body of the dead villager, and she thinks it is that of Jwala and goes into shock. Her father eventually marries her off into another royal family. Unbeknownst to Jwala, Meenakshi is pregnant by him. King Satpal Singh, Meenakshi's brother, is told in a prophecy that he will be killed by his eldest nephew, Dharam. In order to prevent this, he pleads poverty and moves in with his sister.

The Queen gives birth to a healthy baby boy. Satpal takes the baby, minutes after it is born and tosses it out of a window. Instead of falling to its death, though, the baby is caught by Sheroo, who flies him to his master. Jwala has been injured by a tiger and is being healed by a poor arrowsmith and his wife. They are childless and are pleased when the bird brings the baby, believing it to be a gift. They explain what happened to Jwala when he awakes, and he assents to them keeping the child and raising it as their own. In the meanwhile, we learn that the Queen gave birth to twins, and Satpal only dealt with the firstborn. He is satisfied that the prophecy has been averted and now plans to help himself further by swapping his sister's baby with his own. Whilst he is asleep, though, his wife swaps the children back.

As the children grow up, Satpal mistreats his own child, who he believes to be the prince, and dotes on the prince whom he thinks is his own son. The twins grow up. The elder is called Dharam (Dharmendra) and grows up to be an arrowsmith like his father. The younger, Veer (Jeetendra) is the crown prince. The boys become best friends and do not realize that this is because they are actually twin brothers. Dharam falls in love with a princess (Zeenat Aman), while Veer wins the heart of a gypsy girl, Rupa (Neetu Singh). They also meet Jwala Singh, who is the master of swordsmanship. Jwala Singh teaches Dharam the skills of swordsmanship and as a result of Dharam also becomes a master swordsman.

Once the truth about his son is revealed to Satpal, he attempts to get rid of Veer. Before doing so, he realizes he must first break the bond between him and his staunchest supporter, Dharam. The Kingdom has "an eye for an eye" as the ultimate law. Dharam's father is accused of shoddily preparing a chariot wheel which caused a soldier to lose his hands. In reality, Satpal and his son Ranjeet sabotaged it. The Queen is forced to chop of Dharam's father's hands in retribution. Dharam vows never to forgive Veer for this. Satpal and his son then kill Dharam's mother and use one of the prince's royal arrows. Dharam finds this and accuses the prince of the murder. In retribution for the mother he has lost, Dharam demands the Queen become his mother. Although Veer strongly protests, the Queen submits, stating that she must be seen to uphold the law or no one will. For this act, Veer begins to bitterly hate Dharam. Veer challenges Dharam to a duel, and Dharam accepts. Satpal and his son know that in this duel, Dharam will kill Veer, and they will get Dharam executed for Veer's murder. Whilst the boys are fighting, the poor blacksmith reveals the story of how Dharam came to him and his wife. He shows the Queen the cloth the baby was wrapped in. The queen realizes that this was, in fact, her own child, who she believed to have been carried off by a falcon. She stops the fight just in time to stop the brothers from killing each other and reveals their relationship. Reunited, the brothers now face the challenge of disposing of the forces that Satpal Singh has gathered together. In the end, Satpal is killed by Dharam.

Cast
Dharmendra as Dharam Singh
Jeetendra as Veer Singh
Zeenat Aman as Rajkumari Pallavi 
Neetu Singh as Roopa
Pran as Jwala Singh
Indrani Mukherjee as Maharani Meenakshi 
Jeevan as Satpal Singh 
Ranjeet as Ranjeet Singh 
Sujit Kumar as Rajkumar Sujan Singh
Dev Kumar as Dev Singh  
Pradeep Kumar as Maharaja Pratap Singh   
B. M. Vyas as Rajguru
Azad as Azad Singh
D. K. Sapru as Maharaja
Chand Usmani as Roopmati Singh  
Neelam as Dhano  
Hercules as Ramdin Lohar
Bobby Deol as Young Dharam

Soundtrack 
The soundtrack was composed by Laxmikant–Pyarelal, and the lyrics were penned by the veteran Anand Bakshi. The soundtrack of the movie proved to be as popular and successful as the movie itself. Hum Banjaaro ki Baat Mat Pucho ji was a cover of Misirlou.

Box office 
In India, the film grossed . This made it the second highest-grossing film of 1977 at the Indian box office, below Amar Akbar Anthony.

Overseas in the United Kingdom, the film had 23 shows in 5 cities.

In total, the film grossed an estimated  in India and the United Kingdom.

References

External links
 

1977 films
1970s Hindi-language films
Films directed by Manmohan Desai
Films scored by Laxmikant–Pyarelal
Indian fantasy action films
1970s historical fantasy films
1970s fantasy action films
Films about royalty
Films set in the British Raj
Indian epic films
Historical epic films
Indian historical fantasy films
Indian buddy drama films